The Stardust Hottest Film is chosen by the readers of the annual Stardust magazine. The award honours a star that has made an impact with their acting in that certain film.

List of winners

See also 
 Stardust Awards
 Bollywood
 Cinema of India

References 

Stardust Awards